The LNB Pro B Most Valuable Player (MVP) Award is an annual professional basketball award that is given by the second tier division in France, the LNB Pro B. It is awarded to the best player in a given regular season. The unified award was introduced in the 2014–15 season, as before there were awards for a French MVP and a Foreign MVP.

Separated awards (1992–2014)

Unified award (2014–present)

 There was no awarding in the 2019–20, because the season was cancelled due to the coronavirus pandemic in Europe.

References

External links
Official Site 
Eurobasket.com - France

LNB Pro B awards
European basketball awards
Basketball most valuable player awards